Pereruela is a municipality located in the province of Zamora, Castile and León, Spain. According to the 2004 census (INE), the municipality had a population of 673 inhabitants.

See also 

 Arribes del Duero Natural Park
 Zamora city
 Zamora province

References 

Municipalities of the Province of Zamora